This is a non-exhaustive list of the major glaciers in Switzerland. It contains their surface area, their lengths since the start of measurement and the most current year, their height and their outflow. Most of them are retreating and many will vanish.

All glaciers are located within the Swiss Alps. Most of them are situated in the Pennine and Bernese Alps. The Jungfrau-Aletsch protected area includes the largest glaciers of the Alps.

There are glaciers in the four major drainage basins of Switzerland. The Rhine and Rhône basins are located on the northern side of the Alps while the Po basin is located on the south side of the Alps. The Danube basin is located on the east side of the Alps. There are no glaciers in the Swiss portion of the Adige basin.

There are approximately 1,800 glaciers in the Swiss Alps.

List

See also
List of mountains in Switzerland
Retreat of glaciers since 1850#Europe

References

External links

List of dangerous glaciers in Switzerland 
Swiss glacier monitoring network (GLAMOS): glacier length variations in 2016

Glaciers
Switzerland